Marco Fidel Suárez Air Base  is a Colombian military base assigned to the Colombian Air Force (Fuerza Aérea Colombiana or FAC) Military Aviation School (Escuela Militar de Aviación or EMAVI). The base is located in Cali (also known as Santiago de Cali), a city in the Valle del Cauca department of Colombia. It is named for Marco Fidel Suárez, a former president of Colombia.

Facilities 

See also
Transport in Colombia
List of airports in Colombia

References

Airports in Colombia
Colombian Air Force
Military installations of Colombia
Buildings and structures in Valle del Cauca Department